Project Censored is an American nonprofit media watchdog organization. The group's stated mission is to "educate students and the public about the importance of a truly free press for democratic self-government."

Project Censored produces an annual book, published by Seven Stories Press and the Censored Press, and a weekly radio program. Both the annual books and the weekly radio programs, as well as public events sponsored by the Project, focus on issues of news censorship, propaganda, free speech, and politics. 
 
Project Censored was founded at Sonoma State University in 1976 by Carl Jensen (1923-2017). Since 2010, Mickey Huff has been the group's director. It is sponsored by the Media Freedom Foundation, a 501(c)(3) non-profit organization, established in 2000. The organization is based in Fair Oaks, California.

History 
Project Censored was founded in 1976 by Carl Jensen, Associate Professor of Media 
Studies at Sonoma State College, as a media research program. The project focused on student media literacy and critical thinking skills as applied to the US news media censorship.

Corporate media reporters, editors, and executives lampooned Jensen for claiming they "censored" news stories. They argued that the stories were not censored, but that due to time and space constraints, they could not publish every story. Jensen began an annual study that found that, rather than covering newsworthy stories, the corporate media often featured trivial and non-newsworthy stories, which Jensen termed "junk food news" in a 1983 interview published in Penthouse. Since the first Censored yearbook, published in 1993, each annual Censored volume has featured a chapter dedicated to exposing examples of what Jensen originally identified as "junk food news".

In 1996, when Jensen retired, Peter Phillips, also a sociology professor at Sonoma State University, became director of Project Censored. He continued to expand the Project's educational outreach and the annual book, adding the concept and analysis of "News Abuse" to elaborate Jensen's idea of "junk food" news. "News abuse" refers to corporate media stories that were newsworthy, but presented in a slanted or non-newsworthy manner.

In 2000, Project Censored came under the oversight of the non-profit Media Freedom Foundation, founded by Jensen and Phillips to ensure its independence. In 2007, two of Project Censored judges resigned due to then-director Peter Phillips' decision to invite Steven E. Jones, a 9/11 Truth conspiracy theorist, as the keynote speaker to the Project's annual conference.

Mickey Huff of Diablo Valley College became director in 2010. He and associate director Andy Lee Roth have extended the Project beyond Sonoma State University and expanded the Campus Affiliates Program launched in 2009. The top "Censored" news stories are identified through the Campus Affiliates Program, a collaborative effort between faculty and students at many colleges and universities.

Activities

Annual book publication
Since 1993, Project Censored has published its annual list of the most under-reported news stories in the form of a book. Since 1996, Seven Stories Press in New York has published each annual Censored book, totaling 27 volumes . The first Project Censored yearbook, Censored: The News That Didn’t Make the News—And Why, edited by Carl Jensen, was published by Shelburne Press in 1993. Two subsequent volumes, the 1994 and 1995 yearbooks, were published by Four Walls, Eight Windows.

The most recent yearbook, State of the Free Press 2023, includes a forward by Heidi Boghosian and is the second to be jointly published by Seven Stories Press and Project Censored's own publishing imprint, the Censored Press. State of the Free Press 2023 describes itself as "[a]pplying the critical media literacy tools Project Censored has championed since 1976." The book "exposes how the corporate media's focus on 'humilitainment' and 'false balance' leads to slanted news, info-free clickbait, and censorship" while advancing "remedies for a more robust free press" and providing "inspiring models for grassroots engagement." State of the Free Press includes the Project's list of what the group considers to be the most significant but under-reported news stories of 2021-2022.

In addition to being included in the Censored book series, the organization's annual listing of the most significant but under-reported news stories, dating back to 1976, is archived on the Project Censored website. Previous years' "Censored" lists have been featured in U.S. national media outlets.

Additional publications 
Project Censored has also been credited as the coauthor of The Media and Me, also jointly published by Seven Stories Press. The book is described as an exploration of "critical inquiry skills to help young people form a multidimensional comprehension of what they read and watch, opportunities to see others like them making change, and insight into their own identity projects. By covering topics like storytelling, building arguments and recognizing fallacies, surveillance and digital gatekeeping, advertising and consumerism, and global social problems through a critical media literacy lens, this book will help students evolve from passive consumers of media to engaged critics and creators."

Radio program
Since 2010, Project Censored has produced a weekly public affairs program originating from KPFA in Berkeley, California, part of the Pacifica Foundation. The Project Censored Radio Show is syndicated on 40 radio stations across North America.

Documentary films
Project Censored has been the subject of two feature-length documentary films. In 2013, Doug Hecker and Christopher Oscar produced and directed Project Censored: The Movie: Ending the Reign of Junk Food News. The film features interviews with and commentary by Noam Chomsky, Howard Zinn, Dan Rather, Phil Donahue, Michael Parenti, Greg Palast, Oliver Stone, Daniel Ellsberg, Peter Kuznick, Cynthia McKinney, Nora Barrows-Friedman, John Perkins, Jonah Raskin, Khalil Bendib, Abby Martin, and faculty and students associated with Project Censored.

Project Censored: The Movie screened at numerous film festivals, including its premiere at the Sonoma International Film Festival in April 2013, the Bend Film Festival in October 2013, and the Madrid International Film Festival in July 2013, where Doug Hecker and Christopher Oscar were recognized for Best Directing of a Feature Documentary.

In 1998, Differential Films released Project Censored: Is the Press Really Free?, directed and produced by Steven Keller. In May 2000, Project Censored: Is the Press Really Free? aired on PBS stations across the United States.

Reception 
In 2000, the founder of the progressive news analysis and commentary website AlterNet criticized Project Censored as "stuck in the past" with a "dubious selection process" that "reinforces self-marginalizing, defeatist behavior". It has also been criticized for reporting on stories that are arguably not "under-reported" or "censored" at all, as they have appeared in The New York Times and other such high-profile publications.

The use of the term "censorship" to describe under-reported items, rather than governmentally censored material, has been called into question. William Powers, writing in The New Republic called this broad use of the term "pernicious and deceptive."

Project Censored stories have been cited in both national and international media. China News has referenced their work in an editorial criticizing U.S. press practices.  Iranian State News has also cited their work on the U.S.-led invasion of Iraq to criticize U.S. foreign policy.

Ralph Nader described Project Censored as "a deep, wide and utterly engrossing exercise to unmask censorship, self-censorship, and propaganda in the mass media." In December 2013, Nader selected Censored 2014: Fearless Speech in Fateful Times as one of his "10 Books to Provoke Conversation" in 2014.

Awards
In 2008, Project Censored received PEN Oakland's Censorship award.

In July 2014, Mickey Huff and Andy Lee Roth received the National Whistleblowers Center's Pillar Award for New Media on behalf of Project Censored.

References

External links 

 

American journalism organizations
Sonoma State University
Investigative journalism
Censorship in the United States
Sociological organizations
Non-profit organizations based in California
Pleasant Hill, California